The Last Mile is a 1932 American pre-Code crime drama film directed by Samuel Bischoff and starring Preston Foster.
The picture is based on John Wexley's 1930 Broadway play, The Last Mile. Actor Howard Phillips appeared in both the play and the film but in different roles. In 1959, the play was adapted a second time into a film of the same name starring Mickey Rooney.

Plot 
The movie presents life in a prison where men are on death row. Some of them are wrongfully accused and convicted; there is nothing in their future but the electric chair.

Richard Walters is condemned to death for a crime he claims he did not commit. While the drama inside the prison unfolds, his friends on the outside are trying to find evidence that he is innocent.

Cast 

Howard Phillips as Richard "Dick" Walters, Cell 5
Preston Foster as John "Killer" Mears, Cell 4
George E. Stone as Joe Berg, Cell 1
Noel Madison as D'Amoro, Cell 6
Alan Roscoe as Kirby, Cell 7
Paul Fix as Eddie Werner, Cell 8
Al Hill as Fred Mayer, Cell 3
Daniel L. Haynes as Sonny Jackson, Cell 2
Frank Sheridan as Warden Frank Lewis
Alec B. Francis as Father O'Connor
Edward Van Sloan as Rabbi
Louise Carter as Mrs. Walters
Ralph Theodore as Pat Callahan, Principal Keeper
Jack Kennedy as Mike O'Flaherty, Guard
Albert J. Smith as Drake, Guard
William Scott as Peddie, Guard
Kenneth MacDonald as Harris, Guard
Walter Walker as Governor Blaine
 John T. Prince as Jury Member

Notes 
A clip from this film was used by progressive rock band Rush as their introduction to the song "Lock and Key" during its performance on the Hold Your Fire tour, later released on the A Show of Hands laserdisc. The VHS and DVD versions of the film omit the song.

Both Spencer Tracy and Clark Gable played Killer Mears onstage in 1930, Tracy on Broadway and Gable later in Los Angeles, which benefited the careers of both men.

References

External links

1932 films
1932 crime drama films
1930s prison films
American black-and-white films
American crime drama films
American films based on plays
American prison drama films
Films about capital punishment
Films produced by Samuel Bischoff
1930s English-language films
1930s American films